The 1997 PGA Championship was the 79th PGA Championship, held August 14–17 at Winged Foot Golf Club in Mamaroneck, New York, a suburb northeast of New York City. Davis Love III won his only major championship, five strokes ahead of runner-up Justin Leonard, winner of  the 1997 Open Championship.

The last few holes on Sunday were played in a steady rain. However, when Love reached the final green with the tournament wrapped up, the sun peaked through the clouds and a rainbow appeared in the sky. Many took it as a symbol of Love finally winning his first major after several close calls and of his late father, a PGA professional, approvingly looking down from above.

Love's performance is remembered as one of the best in modern major championship history. Only two players finished within 10 shots of him. The sports analytics expert Bill Barnwell statistically identified the victory as the second most dominant win of the modern era (1960–2011), only behind Tiger Woods' 15-shot triumph at the 2000 U.S. Open.

This was the first PGA Championship at the West Course and the fifth major; it previously hosted four U.S. Opens (1929, 1959, 1974, and 1984), which returned in 2006. The tournament was televised by TBS Sports and CBS Sports.

Course layout
West Course

Lengths of the course for previous majors:
 1984 U.S. Open: , par 70
 1974 U.S. Open: , par 70
 1959 U.S. Open: , par 70
 1929 U.S. Open: , par 72

Round summaries

First round
Thursday, August 14, 1997

Second round
Friday, August 15, 1997

Third round
Saturday, August 16, 1997

Final round
Sunday, August 17, 1997

Source:

References

External links
Full results
PGA.com – 1997 PGA Championship

PGA Championship
Golf in New York (state)
Mamaroneck, New York
PGA Championship
PGA Championship
PGA Championship
PGA Championship